The Wimmera River, an inland intermittent river of the Wimmera catchment, is located in the Grampians and Wimmera regions of the Australian state of Victoria. Rising in the Pyrenees, on the northern slopes of the Great Dividing Range, the Wimmera River flows generally north by west and drains into Lake Hindmarsh and Lake Albacutya, a series of ephemeral lakes that, whilst they do not directly empty into a defined watercourse, form part of the Murray River catchment of the Murray-Darling basin.

Course and features
It is joined by fourteen minor tributaries, including the Mackenzie River, before reaching its mouth at Lake Hindmarsh, near Jeparit. The river descends  over its  course.

On the rare occasions that Lake Hindmarsh overflows, water flows via Outlet Creek to Lake Albacutya. In most years the flow of the river does not reach those terminal lakes, and the watercourse itself contracts into a series of pools. On average, the lake fills once in twenty years. The inflow of saline groundwater into the lower reaches of the river in recent years has severely affected its water quality, making the water more salty than sea water in several locations.

The river is crossed by the Pyrenees Highway near its source, the Henty Highway south of Horsham, and the Western Highway west of Horsham and, again, west of Dimboola.

The Wimmera has a feature typical of desert drainage patterns in that it has distributaries, the Dunmunkle Creek and the Yarriambiack Creek, which divert water away from the Wimmera at times of high flow or flood.

Pipeline
The health of the Wimmera River was expected to improve following the Wimmera-Mallee pipeline project that was completed in 2008. The project involved replacing old, inefficient stock-water supply and irrigation infrastructure, with a pipeline system. Prior to the project's completion, up to 90 percent of water extracted from the Wimmera River was lost through evaporation and seepage.  The Wimmera-Mallee Pipeline system was expected to be many times more efficient and meant that there would be much less water extracted from the Wimmera River.  That was anticipated to reduce the quantities of water taken from the river and cause an increase in environmental flows in the river system.

Horsham flooding 

The Wimmera River at Horsham has been subject to periodic flooding, with peaks recorded as follows:

Etymology

In the Aboriginal Djadjawurrung and Jardwadjali languages the river is named Walla-walla, with no defined meaning; and Wamara, possibly meaning woomera or "throwing stick". In the Jardwadjali language the river is named Bunnut, with the Bernett people a clan of the Jardwadjali people; and Barbarton, with bar meaning "river" and the Barbardinbalug were a Jardwadjali clan centred on the Wimmera River. In the Djadjawurrung language the river is named Culcatok, with no defined meaning. In the Djabwurrung, Jardwadjali, and Wergaia languages, the river is named Billiwhin, with no defined meaning. In the Wergaia language the river has several names including Wudjum-bial, with bial meaning red gum; Barengi-djul, with bareng meaning "river" and djul meaning waterbags; Yaigir, with no defined meaning; Wudiyedi, with no defined meaning; Guri-beb, with beb meaning white gum; Giridji-gal, with a meaning that "a dog was always there"; Wadidirabul, with no defined meaning. In the Djabwurrung language the river has several names including Bar and Barkar, with bar meaning "river"; and Tarnorrer and Maripmunninnera, both with no defined meaning. In an undefined local Aboriginal language, the river is named Barrh, with no defined meaning.

The colonial name of the river is derived from the name of the pastoral run. Gold was discovered in the river in 1866.

See also

References

External links

Wimmera catchment
Rivers of Grampians (region)
Wimmera
Grampians (national park)